Ashley David Wooliscroft (born 28 December 1979) is a retired English footballer who played in the Football League for Stoke City.

Career
Wooliscroft was born in Stoke-on-Trent and began his career with local side Stoke City and made his debut for the club on the final day of the 1998–99 season, coming on as a substitute in a 2–0 win over Walsall. In 1999–2000 he played once which came in a FA Cup defeat away at Blackpool. After failing to make an appearance in 2000–01 he was released by Stoke and joined Telford United. He has since played for a large number of non-league and semi-professional clubs. In 2013, he took joint-managerial duties at Leek CSOB.

Career statistics

A.  The "Other" column constitutes appearances and goals in the Football League Trophy.

References

Living people
English footballers
Stoke City F.C. players
Fleetwood Town F.C. players
English Football League players
1979 births
Newcastle Town F.C. players
AFC Telford United players
Leek Town F.C. players
Newtown A.F.C. players
Stalybridge Celtic F.C. players
Hednesford Town F.C. players
Kidsgrove Athletic F.C. players
Northern Premier League players
Telford United F.C. players
Cymru Premier players
Association football defenders